LIGHT, also known as tumor necrosis factor superfamily member 14 (TNFSF14), is a secreted protein of the TNF superfamily. It is recognized by herpesvirus entry mediator (HVEM), as well as decoy receptor 3.

Nomenclature
LIGHT stands for "homologous to lymphotoxin, exhibits inducible expression and competes with HSV glycoprotein D for binding to herpesvirus entry mediator, a receptor expressed on T lymphocytes". In the cluster of differentiation terminology it is classified as CD258.

Function 

The protein encoded by this gene is a member of the tumor necrosis factor (TNF) ligand family. This protein is a ligand for TNFRSF14, which is a member of the tumor necrosis factor receptor superfamily, and which is also known as a herpesvirus entry mediator (HVEM). Two alternatively spliced transcript variant encoding distinct isoforms have been reported.

This protein may function as a costimulatory factor for the activation of lymphoid cells and as a deterrent to infection by herpesvirus. This protein has been shown to stimulate the proliferation of T cells, trigger apoptosis of various tumor cells and play a role in vascular normalisation processes. This protein is also reported to prevent tumor necrosis factor alpha-mediated apoptosis in primary hepatocytes.

Interactions 

LIGHT has been shown to interact with TNFRSF14, TNFRSF6B, BIRC2, TRAF2 and TRAF3.

Role in herpes simplex virus

Similar to how CD4 is the primary mediating receptor in HIV infection, the HSV glycoprotein (gD) binds to the HVEM receptor which is demanded by TNFSF14/LIGHT lowering the ability for LIGHT to activate the NFκB pathway. NFκB is a survival factor helping to inhibit apoptosis which triggers a pathway inhibiting caspase 8. When gD from HSV binds to HVEM, LIGHT is non-competitively inhibited from binding, encouraging apoptosis in the infected cell.

References

Further reading

External links 
 

Clusters of differentiation